Lauri Viljo Kyöstilä (7 May 1896 – 23 September 1984) was a Finnish diver who competed in the 1920 Summer Olympics and 1924 Summer Olympics in the platform event. He was born (and died in) Helsinki, Finland.

References

External links
 

1896 births
1984 deaths
Finnish male divers
Olympic divers of Finland
Divers at the 1920 Summer Olympics
Divers at the 1924 Summer Olympics
Divers from Helsinki